The Unnecessary Sex is a 1915 American silent short comedy film directed by Jack Harvey and starring William Garwood and Violet Mersereau.

External links

1915 comedy films
1915 short films
1915 films
Silent American comedy films
American silent short films
American black-and-white films
Films directed by Jack Harvey
American comedy short films
1910s American films